Nurmahal, oder Das Rosenfest von Kaschmir is an 1822 German-language opera in two acts by Gaspare Spontini, to a libretto by Carl Alexander Herklots after Thomas Moore's Lalla Rookh premiered in Berlin.

References

Operas by Gaspare Spontini
German-language operas
1822 operas
Operas